Lime Lake is a reservoir in Cattaraugus County, New York, in the United States. Lime Lake is an English translation of the Native American name Tecarnowundo.

Fish species present in the lake are yellow perch, bluegill, pumpkinseed sunfish, carp, rock bass, largemouth bass, walleye, tiger muskie, and black bullhead. There is a state owned carry down launch located off Potter Avenue on the east shore.

See also
List of lakes in New York

References

Lakes of Cattaraugus County, New York
Lakes of New York (state)
Reservoirs in New York (state)
Reservoirs in Cattaraugus County, New York